Tax Dodge is a 1982 video game published by Island Graphics. It is the first game created by Free Fall Associates, a developer which later became best known for Archon: The Light and the Dark.

Gameplay
Tax Dodge is a game in which the player moves through a maze collecting the stacks of coins. Having accumulated money, the player then tries to keep as much of it as possible out of the hands of four tax agents who are in constant pursuit.

Development
When asked about the genesis of the concept, designer Jon Freeman replied:

Reception
Allen Doum reviewed the game for Computer Gaming World, and stated that "As a game, Tax Dodge starts easy but becomes quite difficult starting with the fourth year. From there on out, players are going to have to work out patterns and, tricks to stay in the game. My only real complaint is that it seems much harder to 'corner' in this game than in most games — even with practice. Tax Dodge is a good, solid game that makes the most of  theme and somewhat overdone play mechanics."

Jon Freeman, of Free Fall Associates, said that the game appealed to adults, "but the average young gamer just didn't get it."

References

External links
Designer profile in Softline
Book of Atari Software 1983
Review in Antic

1982 video games
Atari 8-bit family games
Atari 8-bit family-only games
Maze games
Video games developed in the United States